Agoseris aurantiaca is a species of plant in the family Asteraceae, commonly called orange agoseris or mountain dandelion. It is widespread in western North America.

Description 
There is no stem, but it does produce several stem-like peduncles. Between June and August, each peduncle bears a single flower head  in width, surrounded by glabrous to hairy phyllaries. The head is ligulate, containing several ray florets but no disc florets. The florets are most commonly orange but are occasionally yellow, pink, red, or purple. "Aurantiaca" means "orange-red". The flower head matures into a ball-like head of beaked achenes, each with a terminal pappus of numerous, white bristles.

It is the only orange-flowered species in the genus, the others typically being yellow.

Varieties
Agoseris aurantiaca var. aurantiaca – most of species range
Agoseris aurantiaca var. purpurea (A.Gray) Cronquist – southern Rocky Mountains

Distribution and habitat
The species is widespread and common in western North America from Alaska and the Northwest Territories in Canada southward to California, Arizona, and New Mexico, and eastward as far as the Rocky Mountains and the Black Hills. There are also isolated populations in the Chic-Choc Mountains on the Gaspe Peninsula and in the Otish Mountains of central Quebec.

It is primarily a species of mountainous regions and may be found in wet to dry habitats.

Uses
A cold infusion of this plant is used by the Ramah Navajo for protection against witches.

References

External links

Plants for a Future
Jepson Manual Treatment
USDA Plants Profile
Calphotos Photo gallery, University of California
Southwest Colorado Wildflowers
Turner Photographics, Wildflowers of the Pacific Northwest
Blackfoot Native Plants

aurantiaca
Flora of the Northwestern United States
Flora of the Southwestern United States
Flora of Western Canada
Flora of California
Flora of New Mexico
Flora of the Rocky Mountains
Flora of the Sierra Nevada (United States)
Plants described in 1833
Taxa named by Edward Lee Greene
Taxa named by William Jackson Hooker
Objects believed to protect from evil
Flora without expected TNC conservation status